Pelle (translated: skin) is the third studio album of the Italian band Punkreas, released in 2000.

Track listing
 Voglio armarmi - 2:50
 Sosta - 3:06
 Sotto esame - 3:36
 Fegato e cuore - 2:50
 Terzo mondo - 4:41
 Terrorista N.A.T.O. - 2:24
 Cosciente - 2:39
 Zingari - 3:49
 Pirati - 2:42
 Tolleranza zero - 3:50

References

2000 albums
Punkreas albums